La Gauloise de Trinité is a multi-sport club located in La Trinité, Martinique. It was founded in 1920.

Sections

Basketball 
La Gauloise de Trinité has a basketball team. In 2019, it changed its logo for the upcoming occasion of its 100th birthday.

Football 

The association football section of La Gauloise has been fairly successful since its creation; it has won the Martinique Championnat National, the highest division of football in Martinique, on five occasions.

Handball 
La Gauloise de Trinité's handball section has seen several famous handballers go through its ranks, notably including Cédric Sorhaindo, Gilles Mazarin, Hyppolite Rapon, and Janou Sejean.

Rugby 
The club has a rugby union team that was founded in 1968, making it the oldest rugby team in Martinique. The rugby section has three parts: the rugby school, the seniors section (men and women), and touch rugby.

Other sports 
 Badminton
Gymnastics

References 

Multi-sport clubs in France
1920 establishments in Martinique
Basketball teams in France
French handball clubs
French rugby union clubs
Badminton clubs
Gymnastics clubs